Bonde la Usongwe, is a administrative ward in Mbeya Rural in the Mbeya Region of Tanzania.

In 2016 reports there were 20,375 people in the ward, from 18,487 in 2012, and 	16,408 in 2002. The ward has .

Villages and hamlets 
The ward has 6 villages, and 54 hamlets.

 Idiga
 Kasale
 Majengo
 Mbale
 Miembeni
 Nansabila
 Nsungwe
 Sigodimwa
 Tazara
 Ikumbi
 Ifisi
 Igawilo
 Ivumu
 Malangali
 Mbale
 Mfindi
 Mgowela
 Lusungo
 Indolo
 Kinondoni
 Lusungo
 Manyala
 Nguvu kazi
 Nsanyila
 Sokoni
 Malowe
 Ilama
 Intake
 Isenga
 Iwejele
 Majengo
 Malowe Kati
 Masoko
 Shifingo
 Ujunjulu A
 Ujunjulu B
 Songwe
 Igalula
 Ileya
 Kilosa
 Maendeleo
 Makondeko
 Maporomoko
 Muungano
 Nteti
 Tagabana
 Zahanati
 Songwe Viwandani
 Darajani
 Estate
 Ijungu
 Iwejele
 Kakuti
 Kaloleni
 Kanisani
 Lugano
 Mkola
 Nsungwe
 Sokoni
 Tambuka reli

References 

Wards of Mbeya Region